Vorgashor (Vörgašor) is an urban locality (an urban-type settlement) under the administrative jurisdiction of Vorkuta, the town of republic significance in the Komi Republic, Russia. As of the 2010 Census, its population was 12,044.

Administrative and municipal status
Within the framework of administrative divisions, the urban-type settlement of Vorgashor, together with another urban-type settlement (Promyshlenny) and one rural locality (the settlement of Yurshor), is incorporated as Vorgashor Urban-Type Settlement Administrative Territory, which is subordinated to the town of republic significance of Vorkuta. Within the framework of municipal divisions, Vorgashor is a part of Vorkuta Urban Okrug.

References

Notes

Sources

Urban-type settlements in the Komi Republic
